Sir Herbert Harley Murray KCB (4 November 1829 – 11 March 1904) was a Scottish colonial governor.

A member of Clan Murray headed by the Duke of Atholl, he was born in Bromley, the son of the Right Reverend George Murray, Bishop of Rochester, by Lady Sarah Maria, daughter of Robert Hay-Drummond, 10th Earl of Kinnoull. He was educated at Christ Church, Oxford and entered the civil service in 1852. A keen amateur cricketer, Murray played first-class cricket for the Marylebone Cricket Club and the Gentlemen of Kent in 1853. He was chairman of England's Board of Customs and then acted as a relief commissioner for Newfoundland after the 1894 bank crash. Murray was made Governor of Newfoundland in 1895 and knighted that same year.

Murray tried in vain to prevent the sale of the Newfoundland Railway to Robert Gillespie Reid by trying to stop the contract from getting royal assent. Murray was critical of Premier James Spearman Winter's administration and was recalled in 1898.

Murray married Charlotte Letitia Caroline, daughter of Charles George James Arbuthnot, in 1859. They had several children. She died in 1884. Murray remained a widower until his death in March 1904, aged 74.

See also
 Governors of Newfoundland
 List of people of Newfoundland and Labrador

External links
Biography at Government House The Governorship of Newfoundland and Labrador
Biography at the Dictionary of Canadian Biography Online

References

1829 births
1904 deaths
Governors of Newfoundland Colony
Herbert
Knights Commander of the Order of the Bath
Scottish colonial officials
19th-century Scottish people
Scottish cricketers
Marylebone Cricket Club cricketers
Gentlemen of Kent cricketers